Lake Mucurca (possibly from Quechua muyuy to turn, to move circularly / to turn a body around its axis, -rqa verbal suffix) is a lake in Peru located in the Arequipa Region, Caylloma Province, Cabanaconde District. It lies west of the Sabancaya volcanic complex. The lake is about 5.8 km long and 1.57 km at its widest point.

See also

List of lakes in Peru

References

INEI, Compendio Estadistica 2007, page 26

Lakes of Peru
Lakes of Arequipa Region